E. Thomas White was an English professional footballer who played as a defender. Born in Uxbridge, he played 21 matches in the Football League for Burnley

References

Footballers from Uxbridge
English footballers
Association football defenders
Burnley F.C. players
English Football League players
Year of death missing
Year of birth missing